Marcelo Tabárez Rodríguez (born 10 February 1993) is a Uruguayan footballer who plays as a forward for Villa Teresa in the Uruguayan Segunda División.

References

External links

1993 births
Living people
Uruguayan footballers
Uruguayan expatriate footballers
Danubio F.C. players
Deportivo Capiatá players
Villa Teresa players
Plaza Colonia players
Uruguayan Primera División players
Paraguayan Primera División players
Uruguayan Segunda División players
Association football forwards
Expatriate footballers in Paraguay
Uruguayan expatriate sportspeople in Paraguay